Kandalur  is a village in Tiruchirappalli taluk of Tiruchirappalli district in Tamil Nadu, India.

Demographics 

As per the 2001 census, Kandalur had a population of 1,022 with 512 males and 510 females. The sex ratio was 996 and the literacy rate, 74.64.

References 

 

Villages in Tiruchirappalli district